Michael Ernest Sweet (born 1979) is a Canadian photographer, writer, and educator. He is the author of two books of street photography, The Human Fragment and Michael Sweet's Coney Island.

Teaching

Sweet was born and raised on his family's horse farm in Martock, Nova Scotia. He taught in public schools in Montreal, Quebec, from 2003 to 2015 and founded Learning for a Cause, which earned him two of Canada's highest civilian honors for service to education, A Prime Minister's Awards for Teaching Excellence and the Queen Elizabeth Diamond Jubilee Medal. Sweet was also a national finalist for a 2011 Governor General's Awards for Excellence in Teaching Canadian History and has been added to the Wall of Fame at the National Teachers Hall of Fame in the United States. As of 2019, Sweet was listed on the faculty at the Robert Louis Stevenson School, a private therapeutic day school in Manhattan, New York.

Photography and writing

Sweet is known for his oddly-framed, gritty, low-fi, close-up street photography, as well as for his use of cheap cameras, including disposable and instant cameras. He is the author of two street photography monographs, The Human Fragment, which earned him praise from photographers Jay Maisel and Roger Ballen, and Michael Sweet's Coney Island, which received praise from photographer Martin Parr. Sweet's grainy close-up black and white shots of Coney Island, earned him a "passing of the torch" in an endorsement from the Coney Island photographer Harold Feinstein, who spent most of his life documenting the famous urban beach. His photography often consists of "human fragments"—partial views of people on the street. His works are mainly presented in black and white, with a grainy texture.

Sweet's photography has won both a portfolio and spotlight prize in Black and White Magazine, a 2020 LifeFramer Award, and a Popular Photography 2013 prize. Sweet has written for the Evergreen Review, Canadian Teacher Magazine, Reed Magazine, English Journal, Photo Life Magazine and others. He was a regular blogger for The Huffington Post photography section from 2014 until early 2017.  Sweet has been a member of the curator team for the World Street Photography organization.

In 2018, Sweet appeared in Garry Winogrand: All Things Are Photographable, a feature-length documentary film on the life of photographer Garry Winogrand produced by Sasha Waters Freyer. In 2021, Sweet appeared in the film, Fill The Frame, a documentary about street photography in New York City.

Sweet wrote for Canada's Photo Life magazine from 2015 until its closure in 2021. He now contributes regularly to the websites F-Stop Magazine and FStoppers.com.

Personal life

Sweet is married to poet Matthew Hittinger.

Publications

Books of work by Sweet
 The Human Fragment. Brooklyn, NY: Brooklyn Arts, 2013. Second edition, 2017. . With a foreword by Michael Musto.
 Michael Sweet's Coney Island. Brooklyn, New York: Brooklyn Arts, 2015. .
 Disposable Camera. Purple Poetry, 2016. .

Booklets of work by Sweet
The Street Photography Bible: an Opinionated Little Guide to Street Photography. Self-published, 2014. .

References

External links
 

Street photographers
Canadian photographers
Writers from Nova Scotia
Canadian expatriates in the United States
People from Hants County, Nova Scotia
Living people
1979 births
Gay photographers
Canadian male non-fiction writers
Canadian gay writers
Canadian gay artists
Canadian LGBT photographers